Mattia Felici (born 17 April 2001) is an Italian professional footballer who plays as a left winger for  club Triestina.

Club career
Born in Rome, Felici started his playing career at local amateur team GSD Nuova Tor Tre Teste, before joining Lecce's youth sector in 2018, initially on loan.

He made his professional debut for Lecce on 23 March 2019, as a 70th-minute substitute for Panagiotis Tachtsidis in a 7–0 Serie B win over Ascoli. He was signed permanently by Lecce by the end of the campaign, and subsequently loaned to Serie D club Palermo for the 2019–20 season. Here, the winger established himself as a regular starter, helping the team win promotion back to Serie C.

After returning to Lecce in July 2020, Felici failed to break into the first team during the 2020–21 Serie B campaign, as well as the first half of the following season, due to a series of injuries. On 5 January 2022, he was loaned back to Palermo, now in Serie C, on a two-year term, with an option to buy. However, at the end of the campaign, on 21 July 2022 Felici terminated both his loan spell and his contract with Lecce by mutual consent.

A couple days later, he was permanently signed by fellow Serie C side Triestina on a three-year deal. Although the team got involved in a relegation battle since the start of the 2022–23 season, Felici established himself as a regular starter and one of the club's most notable performers. However, on 30 November 2022, he was sent-off for violent conduct against referee Dario Madonia in a 2–0 league loss against Piacenza, and subsequently received a four-match ban.

Style of play 
Felici is primarily a left winger, although he can play in several different attacking positions, or even as a left wing-back.

Career statistics

Club

Honours 
Lecce

 Serie B runners-up: 2018–19

References

External links
 

2001 births
Sportspeople from Lazio
Footballers from Lazio
Sportspeople from Rome
Footballers from Rome
Living people
Italian footballers
Association football forwards
U.S. Lecce players
Palermo F.C. players
U.S. Triestina Calcio 1918 players
Serie B players
Serie C players

Serie D players